Yarima Ibrahim Abdullahi is a Nigerian administrator, banker and former minister for Housing, as well as Education and Works. He is a graduate of Manchester University, Britain. He has also served as the Nigerian High Commissioner to Malaysia and Brunei.

References

Year of birth missing (living people)
Living people
Federal ministers of Nigeria
High Commissioners of Nigeria to Brunei
High Commissioners of Nigeria to Malaysia